Estrela de absinto is a Portuguese-language novel by Brazilian author Oswald de Andrade.

1927 Brazilian novels
Portuguese-language novels
Novels by Oswald de Andrade